Caradec is a Breton-language surname (the name Karadeg means "beloved, amiable"). Notable people with the surname include:

 Loïc Caradec, French engineer
 Mickaël Caradec, French footballer
 Jean-Michel Caradec'h, French journalist and writer

See also
Craddock (surname)

References

Breton-language surnames